The Rudolph and Louise Ebert House is located in Fond du Lac, Wisconsin.

History
Rudolph Ebert was a bank president and local politician. As known as the 'Pink Lady', the house was listed on the State Register of Historic Places in 2001 and on the National Register of Historic Places the following year.

References

Houses on the National Register of Historic Places in Wisconsin
National Register of Historic Places in Fond du Lac County, Wisconsin
Houses in Fond du Lac County, Wisconsin
Queen Anne architecture in Wisconsin
Houses completed in 1892